Yogesh Dhama is a member of the Bharatiya Janata Party (BJP). He is also into agriculture and also runs a gas agency. Currently, the Baghpat constituency is held by Yogesh Dhama.

Political career 
In 2017, Yogesh Dhama won the election against Ahmad Hameed of Rashtriya Lok Dal with 6,733 votes and became the MLA of the Baghpat. In 2022, he won against Arun Kasana of Bahujan Samaj Party. The police increased his security after the threat by Sunil Rathi.

Controversy 
Prior to 2022 Uttar Pradesh Legislative Assembly election, he was reported to have broken the election code of conduct when he conducted a public meeting in the village named Khindauda along with loud playing drums. The case was registered against 30 unknown people, including Yogesh Dhama.

References 

Uttar Pradesh MLAs 2017–2022
Uttar Pradesh MLAs 2022–2027
Bharatiya Janata Party politicians from Uttar Pradesh
People from Bagpat district
Living people
Year of birth missing (living people)